Sergio De Gregorio may refer to:

 Sergio De Gregorio (politician) (born 1960), Italian politician and journalist
 Sergio De Gregorio (swimmer) (1946–1966), Italian swimmer